Zakhar Arzamastsev (born November 6, 1992) is a Russian professional ice hockey Defenseman who currently plays with Metallurg Novokuznetsk of the Supreme Hockey League (VHL).

Arzamastsev made his KHL debut playing with Metallurg Novokuznetsk during the 2009–10 KHL season.

Following a brief stint with Rytíři Kladno in the Czech Extraliga (ELH), Arzamastsev returned to the KHL after signing a one-year contract with HC Spartak Moscow for the 2022–23 season on 16 July 2022.

References

External links

1992 births
Living people
Avtomobilist Yekaterinburg players
HC CSKA Moscow players
Kuznetskie Medvedi players
Lokomotiv Yaroslavl players
Metallurg Novokuznetsk players
Salavat Yulaev Ufa players
Severstal Cherepovets players
HC Spartak Moscow players
Russian ice hockey defencemen
Rytíři Kladno players
People from Novokuznetsk
Sportspeople from Kemerovo Oblast
Russian expatriate ice hockey people
Russian expatriate sportspeople in the Czech Republic
Expatriate ice hockey players in the Czech Republic